Pseudoscapanorhynchus is an extinct genus of mackerel sharks that lived during the Cretaceous. It contains one valid species, P. compressidens. It has been found in Europe, Asia, and North America.

References

Lamniformes
Prehistoric cartilaginous fish genera